"It's Funky Enough" is the debut single by American rapper, The D.O.C., featured as the first track on his 1989 debut album No One Can Do It Better. It spent 18 weeks on the US Top Rap Songs chart, including four at #1. A video shot in black and white was made to promote the song.

Background
The song was produced by Dr. Dre. It samples "Misdemeanor" by Foster Sylvers. The song has appeared on many video games such as Grand Theft Auto: San Andreas, True Crime: Streets of LA, and Madden 2005. Its line "Y'all ready for this?" has been sampled on many rap tracks.

Samples and covers
Most notably, "Y'all ready for this?" has been made globally famous as a sample in the song "Get Ready for This" by the early 1990s dance group 2 Unlimited. That song is arguably the most played opening song for arena-based sporting events.

The quote "stop him in his tracks, show him that I am Ruthless" was sampled by Eazy-E for the chorus of his diss song against Dr. Dre, "Real Muthaphuckkin' G's" in 1993.

"It's Funky Enough" was sampled again by Eazy-E in his song "Creep N Crawl", which appears on his 1995 posthumous album Str8 off tha Streetz of Muthaphukkin Compton.

The line "when I am flowing" is sampled by Seattle rapper Kid Sensation in the song "Flowin'", which appears on the 1990 album Rollin' With Number One.

Track listing
US 12" Vinyl Single
A side
"It's Funky Enough" (LP version) - 4:29
"It's Funky Enough" (instrumental) - 4:22
"It's Funky Enough" (a cappella) - 0:44
B side
"No One Can Do It Better" (LP version)- 4:50
"No One Can Do It Better" (instrumental) - 4:50
"No One Can Do It Better" (a cappella) - 1:12

Charts

References

1989 singles
American hip hop songs
G-funk songs
Song recordings produced by Dr. Dre
Songs written by The D.O.C.
Music videos directed by Tamra Davis
1989 songs
Ruthless Records singles
Atlantic Records singles